Sky blue is the name of a colour.

Sky Blue may also refer to:
 RAL 5015 Sky blue, a RAL color
 Sky Blue (film), a 2003 animated South Korean film
 Sky Blue (Maria Schneider album), released in 2007
 Sky Blue (Townes Van Zandt album), a 2019 posthumous album
 Sky Blue FC, a former name for a women's soccer team based in New Jersey, United States
 "Sky Blue", a song from Peter Gabriel's 2002 album Up
 Sky Blue, the first half of Devin Townsend's 2014 double album Z²

See also 
 Sky Blu, a British Antarctic Survey station in Antarctica
 Sky Blu (rapper), stage name of Skyler Austen Gordy (born 1986)
 Sky Blues (disambiguation)